Klin is an air base in Russia located 4 km north of Klin.  It is halfway between Moscow and Tver, with many military transport types (Il-76, An-12, An-26, Tu-134, etc.) in service.  The airfield was active until the 1990s.  Many aircraft remains are still stored on the airfield.

Brinkster.com lists the airfield as home to the 78th Separate Military Aviation Squadron of the 61st Air Army, the former Military Transport Aviation.

During the 1970s an unknown Interceptor Aviation Regiment (IAP) was stationed at Klin flying Su-15TM and MiG-23M aircraft.  This regiment was disbanded in 1979.

References
RussianAirFields.com

Soviet Air Force bases
Soviet Military Transport Aviation
Soviet Air Defence Force bases
Russian Air Force bases